Concentrative nucleoside transporter 2 (CNT2) is a protein that in humans is encoded by the SLC28A2 gene.

See also 
 Concentrative nucleoside transporters
 Nucleoside transporters
 Solute carrier family

References

Further reading 

Solute carrier family